Tim Harrington may refer to:
 Tim Harrington (footballer)
 Tim Harrington (singer)

See also
 Timothy Harrington, Irish journalist and politician
 Timothy Joseph Harrington, American clergyman